Ephialtias pseudena is a moth of the  family Notodontidae. It is found in Panama and the Magdalena Valley of Colombia.

External links
Species page at Tree of Life project

Notodontidae of South America
Moths described in 1870